Reconnaissance regiment (Sōsaku-rentai (搜索聯隊) or Sōsaku-tai (搜索隊)) in Japanese language, was the type of the military establishment within Imperial Japanese Army in the 1940-1945 period.
Reconnaissance regiment was the type of unit derived from Cavalry regiment, tasked with combat scouting. In Japanese military literature reconnaissance regiment is usually abbreviated by SO letters. These regiments were attached to the large number of the Japanese division at the opening stages of the Pacific War. In modern Japan, these regiments are equivalent to Reconnaissance battalion in the divisions of the Japan Ground Self-Defense Force.

Historical background
During the Second Sino-Japanese War, the Japanese military commanders were frequently challenged with situations requiring reconnaissance, rapid messages transfer and using the advantages of the maneuver warfare. Such tasks in Japanese army were regularly performed by cavalry regiments (see Japanese cavalry regiments). Unfortunately, development and wide usage of the machine gun during First World War have exposed extreme weakness of the horseback-riding troops against any defensive positions. Simultaneously, the rapid expansion of automobile production have resulted in many experiments with motorized and mechanized cavalry across the world. Although in Japan was observed a long retention of cavalry regiments and battalions, in 1937-1938 the initial batch of seven Sōsaku-tai (reconnaissance regiments) was introduced into the army of Japan. These were renamed as Sōsaku-rentai during the great army reorganization leading to Pacific War. Since 1940, the existing cavalry regiments were also reorganized into the reconnaissance regiments. Some cavalry regiments were retained. Most notably, Imperial Guard division have kept cavalry regiment while also including reconnaissance regiment. Also, 3rd, 6th, 25th and 26th cavalry regiments were not reorganized until the end of the Pacific War. In Imperial Guard division cavalry regiment did include an armoured car company, and many cavalry regiments have unofficially hoarded tanks even when the 1st Tank Division (Imperial Japanese Army) was formed.

Problems with concept
While the Reconnaissance regiment was envisioned as combination of the Armoured fighting vehicles and Motorized infantry, initial vehicles available for the army was very sparse. It happened because Type 92 Heavy Armoured Car tankette, Type 94 tankette and Type 97 Te-Ke tankette earmarked for reconnaissance, were also overloaded with attack role, and absorbed into the tank regiments. Also, while initial concept was what Reconnaissance regiment must be a self-sufficient fighting force, in practice (especially during Battles of Khalkhin Gol) the mechanized forces were predominantly used to reinforce under-powered infantry units. Therefore, the supply of Armoured fighting vehicles is turned to be grossly inadequate.

As Nanshin-ron strategy was adopted for the Pacific War, the reconnaissance regiments were initially very successful during Japanese conquest of Burma, but later the operations have become increasingly focused on smaller islands. Because the performance limitations of light armoured fighting vehicles were obvious at this point, the reconnaissance regiments were frequently left behind on mainland while infantry forces have headed to outlying islands. Therefore, reconnaissance regiments have turned unnecessary one after another and disbanded. Personnel was typically reassigned to the tank units. While at the peak the Japanese army had 40 reconnaissance regiments, by the end of war only 23 remained, of them 9 being significantly under-strength.

Orders of battle
Reconnaissance regiments were a small-scale units, comprising about 500 men in total. Therefore, they did not have battalions in structure, and were usually commanded by Major instead of Colonel as was typical for infantry regiment. Difference in order of battle between regiments and even between same regiment in different times were very large. Furthermore, the regiment was frequently tailored to fit into the available transport ship.

Order of battle (1937-1938)
Headquarters
Cavalry squadron
Armored car company - 5 x Type 92 heavy armoured car tankette or other available tankettes

Order of battle (1939-1941)
Headquarters
Cavalry squadron
Motorized infantry company (with Type 94 6-Wheeled Truck, Type 95 reconnaissance car and other vehicles)
Armored car company - 5-8 x various armoured cars or tankettes (based on availability)

Order of battle (1942-1945, of infantry division)
This the typical wartime reconnaissance regiment (most typical being 2nd and 16th regiments), compared to earlier version it has part of horses replaced by Type 97 motorcycles.
Headquarters
1. Cavalry squadron
2. Cavalry squadron
1. Armored car company - 8 x  tankettes
2. Armored car company - 8 x  tankettes
Signals platoon

Order of battle (1942-1945, of tank division)
First three tank divisions had the reconnaissance regiment attached. Due to lack of Japanese self-propelled guns, these were frequently substituted for Type 97 Chi-Ha medium tanks or even for light tanks.
Headquarters
1. Light Tank Company  - 10 x Type 95 Ha-Go or other light tank
2. Light Tank Company  - 10 x Type 95 Ha-Go or other light tank
3. Light Tank Company (optional) - 10 x Type 95 Ha-Go or other light tank
 Cavalry squadron
 Self-propelled artillery company - 10 x Self-propelled gun and 2 x Type 95 Ha-Go or other light tank
 Maintenance company

Notable military operations

23rd division
During the Battles of Khalkhin Gol the reconnaissance regiment of the 23rd division was just organized.　During Japanese advance in July 1939, it was responsible for cutting the retreat route of the Soviet army. Although it reached designated position, failure of other units has resulted in regiment being surrounded and wiped out. Notable, reconnaissance regiment was only unit who was able to retreat from height after running out of ammunition and food (all other troop were annihilated), and regiment commander (Ioki Sasaki) has pleaded guilty for unauthorized retreat before court-martial.

56th division
During the early stages of Japanese conquest of Burma, the reconnaissance regiment of the 56th division played an active role at the spearhead of advance. Regiment landed in Yangon 26 March 1942, and soon
Regiment landed to Rangoon on March 26, 1942, and occupied Taungoo 220 km away 1 April 1942. Then, a motorized infantry company and engineer (bridging) company headed north, reaching Bhamo 4 May 1942 after over 1400 km long travel.

Battle of Leyte
The reconnaissance regiment of the 1st division, tailored down to headquarters, infantry company and machine gun platoon without any vehicles (about 200 men in total), have landed in Ormoc in late November 1944. After receiving horses and tanks from 2nd division, it took mountain-top positions and was able to defend the critical passes for over the month against 24th Infantry Division (United States). After all other Japanese units in vicinity have started retreating, the order of retreat had difficulty reaching the reconnaissance regiment, with only 45 members of the regiment surviving as the result.

List of reconnaissance regiments

References and future reading
This page incorporates material from the Japanese Wikipedia page Reconnaissance regiment, accessed 22 January 2016

Cavalry regiments
Army reconnaissance regiments
Regiments of World War II
Military units and formations of the Imperial Japanese Army